is a Japanese voice actress from Tokyo, Japan. Starting from April 1, 2019, it was announced that she took an indefinite hiatus.

Filmography

Anime
2005
Kotenkotenko (Fairy)

2006
NANA (Woman)
Nishi no Yoki Majo - Astraea Testament (Marie Oset)
Ramen Fighter Miki (Child 1 (ep. 1), Female student (ep. 4), Pink Star (ep. 3), Sales assistant (ep. 5)
Koi suru Tenshi Angelique (Girl (ep. 1))
Kemonozume (Girl (ep. 2), Shokujinki B (ep. 9))
Garine's is Music (Garine Sakura)
Living for the Day After Tomorrow (Karada Iokawa)
Ghost Slayers Ayashi (Daughter)
Hell Girl: Two Mirrors (Takuma Kurebayashi)
Bartender (Miwa Kurushima)

2007
Gakuen Utopia Manabi Straight! (Futsal member (ep. 8))
Nodame Cantabile (Flight attendant (ep. 1), Minako Momodaira (young), Yuki Inoue)
Hayate the Combat Butler (Chiharu Harukaze)
Touka Gettan (Nene Midou)
Over Drive (Mikoto's Sister, Masaro)
Polyphonica (Suzuna)
Bakugan Battle Brawlers (Tsuyoshi, Shirutisu)
Bokurano (Reporter)
Kaze no Stigma (Ayano Kannagi)
Potemayo (Mimi Hachiya)
Suteki Tantei Labyrinth (Chiharu)
Clannad (Female student (ep. 6))
Shakugan no Shana Second (Kimiko Nakamura)
You're Under Arrest: Full Throttle
Shugo Chara! (Yuki Hatoba)
Ghost Hound (Female elementary school student A (ep. 14), Female student (ep. 5), Underclassman B (ep. 17))

2008
Shigofumi: Letters from the Departed (Woman (ep. 2))
Porphy no Nagai Tabi (Mina)
Aria the Origination (Daughter (ep. 1))
Yatterman (Hirari)
Allison & Lillia (Female soldier (ep. 5))
Blassreiter (Lulu)
Nabari no Ou (Raimei Shimizu)
Psychic Squad 'Naomi Umegae)
Kaiba (Ed)
Golgo 13 (Natalie)
Kyōran Kazoku Nikki (Kyōka Midarezaki)
Ikki Tousen: Great Guardians (Chō Shōshifu)
Birdy the Mighty: Decode (Ryoko Nagatani)
Sands of Destruction (Lowen)
Natsume's Book of Friends (Female High School Student (ep. 9), Fiancée (ep 8), Student (ep. 4), young Takashi Natsume)
Noramimi (Muimui)
Legends of the Dark King: A Fist of the North Star Story (Shimoto)
Shugo Chara!! Doki— (Mimori Morino)

2009
Asu no Yoichi! (Saleslady)
Chrome Shelled Regios (Countia Varmon Faness (eps 1, 23-24), Secretary A (10 episodes), Shop employee (ep. 4), Waitress (ep. 5))
Kupu!! Mamegoma! (Akane Mamegawa)
Examurai Sengoku (Tsuzumi)
Major (Announcer)
Pandora Hearts (White cat)
Basquash! (Aurora Skybloom)
Queen's Blade: The Exiled Virgin (Emperor Hinomoto)
Slap Up Party
Hayate the Combat Butler!! (Chiharu Harukaze)
Shin Mazinger Shōgeki! Z-Hen (Shirō Kabuto)
Hatsukoi Limited (Nao Chikura)
Sweet Blue Flowers (Yoshie Manjome)
Taisho Baseball Girls (Noriko Owari)
Modern Magic Made Simple (Katamari, Mayuri Anehara)
Shugo Chara! Party! (Yuka)
Tegami Bachi (Niche)
The Sacred Blacksmith (Cecily Cambell)
Yumeiro Pâtissière (Azuki Tachibana)

2010
Ladies versus Butlers! (Mitsuru Sanke)
The Qwaser of Stigmata (Mafuyu Oribe)
Hanamaru Kindergarten (Ryōta)
Ikki Tousen: Xtreme Xecutor (Shifu Choushou)
Kaichō wa Maid-sama! (Misaki Ayuzawa)
Mayoi Neko Overrun! (Actual Sister)
Uragiri wa Boku no Namae o Shitteiru (Young Hotsuma)
Sekirei: Pure Engagement (Namiji)
Academy Apocalypse: Highschool of the Dead (Reporter (ep. 6))
Panty & Stocking with Garterbelt (Kneesocks)
Bakuman. (Aiko Iwase)
Tegami Bachi: Reverse (Niche)
Psychic Detective Yakumo (Haruka Ozawa)
Squid Girl (Eiko Aizawa)
And Yet The Town Moves (Homeroom teacher)
A Certain Magical Index II (Seiri Fukiyose)

2011
Pretty Rhythm Aurora Dream (Yuri)
Astarotte's Toy (Griselda "Zelda" Reginhard)
The Qwaser of Stigmata II (Mafuyu Oribe)
Blue Exorcist (Young Yukio Okumura)
Inazuma Eleven GO (Kageyama Hikaru)
Squid Girl Season 2 (Eiko Aizawa)
Bakuman. 2 (Aiko Iwase)
Shakugan no Shana III (Kimiko Nakamura)
Chibi Devi! (Ms. Ito, Pepe, Ryu, Aunt Rikako)
Hunter × Hunter (2011) (Neferpitou)

2012
Aquarion Evol (MIX)
Lagrange: The Flower of Rin-ne (Ayane Iwa, Haruka Uehara)
Ozuma (Mimei)
Zetman (Mayu Hashimoto)
Mysterious Girlfriend X (Ryōko Suwano)
EUREKA SEVEN AO (Maggie Kwan)
Inazuma Eleven GO 2: Chrono Stone (Kageyama Hikaru, Okatsu)
Muv-Luv Alternative: Total Eclipse (Aki Iwami)
Upotte!! (Emten)
Love, Elections & Chocolate (Kii Monzen'naka)
Hayate the Combat Butler: Can't Take My Eyes Off You (Chiharu Harukaze)
The Pet Girl of Sakurasou (Saori Himemiya)
Bakuman. 3 (Aiko Iwase)
Psycho-Pass (MC (ep. 9), Reporter (ep. 17))

2013
Danchi Tomoo (Keiko Kamakura)
Dokidoki! Precure (Kyouda)
Gargantia on the Verdurous Planet (Striker)
Hayate the Combat Butler! Cuties (Chiharu Harukaze)
Kill la Kill (Mataro Mankanshoku, Rei Hououmaru)
Gingitsune (Haru)
Inazuma Eleven GO 3: Galaxy (Rodan Gasgus)

2014
Saki: The Nationals (Murakichi Misaki)
Aikatsu! (Kanon)
Doraemon (Pita)
Buddy Complex (Lene Kleinbeck)
Hero Bank (Sen Tatsuzato)
Buddy Complex: Kanketsu-hen Ano Sora ni Kaeru Mirai de (Lene Kleinbeck)
HappinessCharge PreCure! (Kazumi)
Rokujyoma no Shinryakusha!? (Study Group Director)
Free! - Eternal Summer (Hayato Shigino)
Rail Wars! (Alice Kuji)
Rage of Bahamut: Genesis (Gabriel)
Inō-Battle wa Nichijō-kei no Naka de (Hitomi Saito)
Pocket Monsters XY (Eclair)

2015
Isuca (Isuca)
JoJo's Bizarre Adventure: Stardust Crusaders (Young Polnareff)
Log Horizon 2 (Roe2)
Seraph of the End: Battle in Nagoya (Aiko Aihara)
Haikyū!! (Hana Misaki)
The Idolmaster Cinderella Girls (Rookie trainer, veteran trainer, trainer)
The Idolmaster Cinderella Girls 2nd Season (Rookie trainer, veteran trainer, trainer)
The Rolling Girls (Masami Utoku / Maccha Green)
Tantei Kageki Milky Holmes TD (Tianma Hiroko)

2016
Magi: Adventure of Sinbad (Pipirika)
Mob Psycho 100 (Ichi Mezato)
Norn9 (Koharu)

Original video animation (OVA)
 Shakugan no Shana Tokubetsuhen: Koi to Onsen no Kougai Gakushuu! (2006) (Kimiko Nakamura)
 Mobile Suit Gundam Unicorn (2010) (Audrey Burne)
 Astarotte no Omocha! (2011) (Griselda "Zelda" Reginhard)
 Rinne no Lagrange: Kamogawa Days (2012) (Haruka Uehara)
 Love, Chunibyo & Other Delusions Lite (2012) (Tomo-chan)
 Love, Chunibyo & Other Delusions! -Heart Throb- Lite (2014) (Tomo-chan)

Films
 Naruto Shippuden the Movie (2007) (Shion)
 Space Battleship Yamato: Resurrection (2009) (Miyuki Kodai)
 Hayate the Combat Butler! Heaven Is a Place on Earth (2011) (Chiharu Harukaze)
 The Mystical Laws (2012) (Leika Chan)
 Santa Company (2014) (Noel) 
 Aikatsu! (The Movie) (2014) (Kanon)
 Girls und Panzer der Film (2015) (Megumi, Boco)
 Mobile Suit Gundam Narrative (2018) (Mineva Lao Zabi)
 Natsume's Book of Friends the Movie: Tied to the Temporal World (2018) (Young Takashi Natsume)

Video games
2007
 Shoukan Shoujo: Elemental Girl Calling (Chakoru, Robin, Mel)
 Corpse Seed (Koharu Shinozaki, Kotori Shinozaki, Kokoa Shinozaki, Kokoro Shinozaki)

2008
 Aoi Shiro (Kyan Migiwa)
 Luminous Arc 2 Will (Erishia)
 Corpse Seed: Plant Revolution (Koharu Shinozaki, Kotori Shinozaki, Kokoa Shinozaki, Kokoro Shinozaki)
 Asaki, Yumemishi (Koku, Miku)
 Zettai Karen Children DS: Dai-4 no Children (Naomi Umegae)
 Tetsudō Musume DS ～Terminal Memory～ (Arisu Kuji)

2009
 Boku no Natsuyasumi 4 (Princess Tomoko)
 Corpse Seed 2 (Koharu Shinozaki, Kotori Shinozaki, Kokoa Shinozaki, Kokoro Shinozaki)
 Kidō Senshi Gundam: Senki Record U.C. 0081 (Figline Isuteru)
 Rune Factory 3: A Fantasy Harvest Moon (Marion)
 Queen's Blade: Spiral Chaos (Harpy)
 Final Fantasy XIII (Cocoon Citizens)

2010
 Corpse Seed 2: Burning Gluttony (Koharu Shinozaki, Kotori Shinozaki, Kokoa Shinozaki, Kokoro Shinozaki)
 Super Street Fighter IV (Ibuki)
 Tsuyokiss (PSP) (As Serebu Tachibana)

2011
 The Legend of Zelda: Skyward Sword (Fi)

2012
 Street Fighter X Tekken (Ibuki)
 Generation of Chaos: Pandora's Reflection (Olivia)
 Touhou: Azure Reflections (Marisa Kirisame)
 Corpse Seed 3 (Koharu Shinozaki, Kotori Shinozaki, Kokoa Shinozaki, Kokoro Shinozaki)
 Koi to Senkyo to Chocolate Portable (Kii Monzennaka)
 Under Night In-Birth (Yuzuriha)
 Halo 4 (Cortana)
Tekken Tag Tournament 2 (Miharu Hirano)

2013
 Z/X Zekkai no Seisen (Natalia Cambiasso)
 Norn 9 (Koharu)
 The Last of Us (Sarah)
 BlazBlue: Chronophantasma (Konoe A. Mercury/Phantom)
 The Witch and The Hundred Knights (Visco)
 Arcadia no Senhime (Luise)
 The Legend of Zelda: A Link Between Worlds (Princess Zelda)

2014
 Corpse Seed 3: Heartclub Extreme (Koharu Shinozaki, Kotori Shinozaki, Kokoa Shinozaki, Kokoro Shinozaki)
Croixleur Sigma (Francesca Storaro)
Hyrule Warriors (Fi)
Granblue Fantasy (Korwa)

2015
Resident Evil: Revelations 2 (Moira Burton)
Batman: Arkham Knight (Catwoman)
BlazBlue: Central Fiction (Nine the Phantom)

2016
Star Ocean: Integrity and Faithlessness (Anne Petriceani)
Street Fighter V (Ibuki)
The King of Fighters XIV (Zarina)

2017
Arms (Mechanica)
 Corpse Seed 4 (Koharu Shinozaki, Kotori Shinozaki, Kokoa Shinozaki, Kokoro Shinozaki)
Ever Oasis (Tethu/Tethi)

2018
 Corpse Seed 4: Endless Brawl (Koharu Shinozaki, Kotori Shinozaki, Kokoa Shinozaki, Kokoro Shinozaki)
SNK Heroines: Tag Team Frenzy (Zarina)
Super Smash Bros. Ultimate (Princess Zelda/Sheik, Mii Fighter Type 4)
Dragalia Lost (Aeleen)
BlazBlue: Cross Tag Battle (Nine the Phantom, Yuzuriha)

2019
Arknights (Rope/Savage)

2021
The Legend of Zelda: Skyward Sword HD (Fi - voice archive)

Drama CDs
 Café Latte Rhapsody (????) (Ichikawa)

Tokusatsu
Kamen Rider Drive (2015) (Sigma Circular (Female Voice) (ep. 46 - 47)) (Male Voice by Masakazu Morita)

Dubbing roles

Live-action
The Art of Getting By – Sally Howe (Emma Roberts)
Cleveland Abduction – Amanda Berry (Samantha Droke)
CSI: Cyber – Raven Ramirez (Hayley Kiyoko)
Did You Hear About the Morgans? – Jackie Drake (Elisabeth Moss)
Dredd – Cassandra Anderson (Olivia Thirlby)
Expelled – Vanessa (Andrea Russett)
Harry Potter and the Half-Blood Prince – Katie Bell (Georgina Leonidas)
Harry's Law – Jenna Backstrom (Brittany Snow)
Journey 2: The Mysterious Island – Kailani (Vanessa Hudgens)
Love, Rosie – Rosie Dunne (Lily Collins)
Monte Carlo – Grace Bennett / Cordelia Winthrop-Scott (Selena Gomez)
Ouija – Laine Morris (Olivia Cooke)
Ratter – Emma (Ashley Benson)
The Sound of Music (2011 TV Tokyo edition) – Liesl von Trapp (Charmian Carr)
Spin Out – Lucy (Morgan Griffin)
The Suspect – Choi Kyung-hee (Yoo Da-in)
Terminator Genisys – Sarah Connor (Emilia Clarke)
The Way, Way Back – Susanna Thompson (AnnaSophia Robb)
We're the Millers – Casey Mathis (Emma Roberts)

Animation
Mars Needs Moms – Ki

Notes

References

External links
Official agency profile 

1982 births
Living people
Japanese video game actresses
Japanese voice actresses
Ken Production voice actors
Voice actresses from Tokyo
21st-century Japanese actresses